Dido's Lament is the aria "When I am laid in earth" from the opera Dido and Aeneas by Henry Purcell (libretto by Nahum Tate).

It is included in many classical music textbooks on account of its exemplary use of the passus duriusculus in the ground bass. The conductor Leopold Stokowski wrote a transcription of the piece for symphony orchestra. It is played annually in London by the massed bands of the Guards Division at the Cenotaph remembrance parade in Whitehall on Remembrance Sunday, the Sunday nearest to November 11 (Armistice Day).

The Aeneid 

The text, and Purcell's opera, alludes to the Aeneid, the Roman legend of the Trojan warrior Aeneas, travelling to Italy from the betrayed and fallen Troy in order to settle there and secure his son Ascanius's lineage. Their ship is blown off course from Sicily, and they land on the shore of North Africa, in Carthage, a town newly settled by refugees from Tyre. Aeneas falls in love with their queen, Dido, but dutifully departs for Italy, leaving her. Distraught at his betrayal, she orders a pyre to be built and set ablaze so that Aeneas will see from his ship that she has killed herself. She sings the lament before stabbing herself as Aeneas sails on.

Analysis 
The opening recitative secco, "Thy hand, Belinda", is accompanied by continuo only. Word painting is applied on the text "darkness" and "death" which is presented with chromaticism, symbolic of death.

Dido's Lament opens with a descending chromatic fourth line, the ground bass,

which is repeated eleven times throughout the aria, thus structuring the piece in the form of a passacaglia.

Henry Purcell has applied word painting on the words "laid", which is also given a descending chromatic line portraying death and agony,

and "remember me", which is presented in a syllabic text setting and repeated

with its last presentation leaping in register with a sudden crescendo

displaying her desperate cry with urgency as she prepares for her fate: death. In one interpretation, Dido's relationship with Aeneas is portrayed in this moment as an "apocalyptic romance".

Text 

Recitative
Thy hand, Belinda, darkness shades me,
On thy bosom let me rest,
More I would, but Death invades me;
Death is now a welcome guest.

Aria
When I am laid, am laid in earth, May my wrongs create
No trouble, no trouble in thy breast;
Remember me, remember me, but ah! forget my fate.
Remember me, but ah! forget my fate.

Sources

External links 
 , "Dido's Lament" are movements 37 and 38 in this edition
 
 , Elin Manahan Thomas, with score

Arias in English
Compositions by Henry Purcell
Compositions in G minor
Opera excerpts
Songs about death
Cultural depictions of Dido
Works based on the Aeneid
Articles containing video clips